Carnival Freedom is a  operated by Carnival Cruise Line. She is the 22nd operating vessel in the fleet, and the last of the Conquest-class ships. The ship was built as part of a four-ship deal with Fincantieri's Marghera shipyard and was launched in Venice, Italy on April 28, 2006. She was delivered to Carnival on February 28, 2007.

History

The ship was built by Fincantieri at its Marghera shipyard in Venice, Italy. She was floated out on April 28, 2006, delivered to Carnival on February 28, 2007, and formally named in Venice by American model, actress, author and entrepreneur Kathy Ireland on March 4, 2007. The ship is also one of the first of the Carnival Cruise Line fleet to get a complete to maintain of the kids’ program.

Carnival Freedom entered a three-week routine drydock in Freeport, Bahamas on March 30, 2014 for refurbishment and completed another dry dock in March 2019. In 2019 March, the ship debuted with its water park and major renovation.

Areas of operation
Carnival Freedom initially sailed from her homeport in Civitavecchia near Rome on Mediterranean cruises until the Fall of 2007 when she sailed the Caribbean Sea from the Port of Miami.  In the summer of 2008, she returned to Europe and sailed in the Mediterranean again.  In the fall of 2008, she sailed the Caribbean again but out of Port Everglades until February 2015 when she changed her home port to Galveston, Texas. Carnival Freedom resumed port calls to Grand Bahama in November 2019 when Hurricane Dorian ravaged the country. The ship will reposition to Seattle and sail at Alaska in 2021.

Incidents
In 2019, a photographer took a picture of the ship emitting black smoke in Cayman Islands. The cruise line told the media that the smoke was caused by an engine turbocharger malfunction.

COVID-19
 On March 23, 2020, a crew member who had sailed on the six day March 8 cruise out of Galveston, Texas was hospitalized in Gulfport, Mississippi after experiencing flu-like symptoms. On March 25 they received a positive test result for COVID-19 and passengers from the cruise were subsequently asked to quarantine for 14 days by the cruise line. The passengers had disembarked in Galveston, Texas on March 14 – a day after Carnival Cruise Line suspended operations due to coronavirus.

May 26, 2022 funnel fire

On May 26, 2022, Carnival Freedom suffered a large fire in her funnel while she was docked in Grand Turk. The fire was extinguished with no injuries reported. Significant damage was sustained to part of the funnel, on the starboard side. Guests and crew members were allowed to go ashore, as originally planned in Grand Turk. It was announced in the evening of May 26, 2022, by Carnival through a letter to guests that the Carnival Freedom would remain in Grand Turk with passengers on board.  was scheduled to embark passengers from Carnival Freedom as the ship would not be returning to Port Canaveral. Following the incident, Carnival Freedom underwent an emergency drydock in Grand Bahama for repairs, which included the removal of the funnel's damaged wings. As for compensation, Carnival gave a $100 per stateroom onboard credit and a 50 percent off future cruise credit. Any additional parking fees at the Port Canaveral parking garage were waived, and Carnival would cover fees related to changed flights up to $200 per person. The ship resumed normal service on June 11, 2022, with the altered funnel.

References

Notes

Bibliography

External links

Official website

Freedom
Ships built in Venice
Ships built by Fincantieri
2006 ships